The Scottish Tartans Society (STS) was a society committed to the recording and preservation of woven tartan designs from around the world; it maintained the Register of All Publicly Known Tartans. The society was first formed in 1963 and existed for about 40 years. The Scottish Tartans Society ceased to record new tartan designs in about the year 2000, having recorded about 2,700 different designs. Today, similar functions are provided by the Scottish government's Scottish Register of Tartans (SRT), which affords some legal recognition to tartans registered with it, and the nonprofit Scottish Tartans Authority (STA), founded by former STS members.

Creation and closure

The Scottish Tartans Society was first formed in 1963, by several scholars of tartan and Highland dress, with the encouragement of the Lord Lyon King of Arms. The society set out to preserve and record every woven tartan known, including clan tartans and artefacts from several museums and private collections. The society also strove to promote  research into Highland dress, and to assist in the designing of new tartans. It was also a recognised charity, under Scots law. The society's register of tartans was known as the Register of All Publicly Known Tartans. This register was originally a physical collection, consisting of tartans and fabrics. Later, however, the register was eventually transferred to computer in the form of an electronic database. In 1976, the society was accounted as an "Incorporation Noble in the Noblesse of Scotland", being granted a coat of arms by the Lord Lyon King of Arms. In 1988, the society established a museum of tartan and Highland dress in Highlands, North Carolina, United States. In 1994, the museum moved to Franklin, North Carolina, where it exists today. In 1996, several members of the society left to create their own organisation, called the Scottish Tartans Authority, or (STA). The Scottish Tartans Society ran into financial difficulties and ceased to record new tartan designs around the year 2000. By this time, about 2,700 tartans had been recorded by the society. Among the tartans recorded by the society are clan or family, district, individual, commemorative, and various other tartans. The society is now defunct.

Scottish Tartans World Register 

The archives of the Scottish Tartans Society were kept, since STS's closure, by the Scottish Tartans World Register (STWR). This organisation was a non-authoritative body formed by a consultant to STS, and aimed to record any tartan, new or old, upon request. STWR is the trading name of a registered company, Tartan Registration Limited, also a registered Scottish charity.

STWR's database, also called the Scottish Tartans World Register, was based upon the Register of All Publicly Known Tartans, and included about 3,000 tartan designs.  The STWR's data has been subsumed into that of the Scottish Register of Tartans (SRT) in Edinburgh, which is the Scottish government's official register of tartans. STWR no longer registers tartans, and directs interested parties to the SRT.

References

External links
Tartans of Scotland, official website of the Scottish Tartans World Register. Contains free information on its list of registered tartans.

1963 establishments in Scotland
2000 disestablishments in Scotland
Arts organizations established in 1963
Charities based in Scotland
Defunct clubs and societies of the United Kingdom
Heritage organisations in Scotland
Tartan organisations